Coleophora argentella is a moth of the family Coleophoridae. It is found in the United States, including Colorado.

References

argentella
Moths described in 1875
Moths of North America